Fish Point may refer to:
 Fish Point (Queensland), a point
 Fish Point (South Australia), a point
 Fish Point (Tasmania), a point
 Fish Point, Victoria, a locality
 Fish Point (Houtman Abrolhos), Western Australia, a locality
 Livingston, Kentucky, in the United States, a city formerly known as Fish Point